is a Japanese politician of the Liberal Democratic Party, a member of the House of Representatives in the Diet (national legislature). A native of Ōta, Tokyo and graduate of the University of Tokyo, he was elected to the House of Representatives for the first time in 1976. From 1993 to 1994 he was Director General of the Japan Defense Agency. After losing his seat in 2000, he retired in 2002 but was re-elected in 2005.

References

External links 
  in Japanese.

1937 births
Living people
People from Ōta, Tokyo
Politicians from Tokyo
Members of the House of Representatives (Japan)
Liberal Democratic Party (Japan) politicians
Japanese defense ministers
21st-century Japanese politicians